Elias Canetti (25 July 1905 – 14 August 1994;) was a German-language writer, born in Ruse, Bulgaria to a Sephardic family. They moved to Manchester, England, but his father died in 1912, and his mother took her three sons back to continental Europe. They settled in Vienna.

Canetti moved to England in 1938 after the Anschluss to escape Nazi persecution. He became a British citizen in 1952.  He is known as a modernist novelist, playwright, memoirist, and nonfiction writer. He won the Nobel Prize in Literature in 1981, "for writings marked by a broad outlook, a wealth of ideas and artistic power". He is noted for his nonfiction book Crowds and Power, among other works.

Life and work

Early life
Born in 1905 to businessman Jacques Canetti and Mathilde née Arditti in Ruse, a city on the Danube in Bulgaria, Canetti was the eldest of three sons. His ancestors were Sephardic Jews. His paternal ancestors settled in Ruse from Ottoman Adrianople. The original family name was Cañete, named after Cañete, Cuenca, a village in Spain.

In Ruse, Canetti's father and grandfather were successful merchants who operated out of a commercial building, which they had built in 1898. Canetti's mother descended from the Arditti family, one of the oldest Sephardic families in Bulgaria, who were among the founders of the Ruse Jewish colony in the late 18th century. The Ardittis can be traced to the 14th century, when they were court physicians and astronomers to the Aragonese royal court of Alfonso IV and Pedro IV. Before settling in Ruse, they had migrated into Italy and lived in Livorno in the 17th century.

Canetti spent his childhood years, from 1905 to 1911, in Ruse until the family moved to Manchester, England, where Canetti's father joined a business established by his wife's brothers. In 1912, his father died suddenly, and his mother moved with their children first to Lausanne, then Vienna in the same year. They lived in Vienna from the time Canetti was aged seven onwards. His mother insisted that he speak German, and taught it to him. By this time Canetti already spoke Ladino (his native language), Bulgarian, English, and some French; the latter two he studied in the one year they were in Britain. Subsequently, the family moved first (from 1916 to 1921) to Zürich and then (until 1924) to Frankfurt, where Canetti graduated from high school.

Canetti went back to Vienna in 1924 in order to study chemistry. However, his primary interests during his years in Vienna became philosophy and literature. Introduced into the literary circles of First-Republic Vienna, he started writing. Politically leaning towards the left, he was present at the July Revolt of 1927 – he came near to the action accidentally, was most impressed by the burning of books (recalled frequently in his writings), and left the place quickly with his bicycle. He received a doctorate in chemistry from the University of Vienna in 1929, but never worked as a chemist.

He published two works in Vienna, Komödie der Eitelkeit 1934 (The Comedy of Vanity) and 
Die Blendung 1935 (Auto-da-Fé, 1935),  before escaping to Great Britain. He reflected the experiences of Nazi Germany and political chaos in his works, especially exploring mob action and group thinking in the novel Die Blendung and in the non-fiction Crowds and Power (1960). He wrote several volumes of memoirs, contemplating the influence of his multi-lingual background and childhood.

Personal life

In 1934 in Vienna he married Veza (Venetiana) Taubner-Calderon (1897–1963), who acted as his muse and devoted literary assistant. Canetti remained open to relationships with other women. He had a short affair with Anna Mahler. In 1938, after the Anschluss with Germany, the Canettis moved to London. He became closely involved with the painter Marie-Louise von Motesiczky, who was to remain a close companion for many years. His name has also been linked with the author Iris Murdoch (see John Bayley's Iris, A Memoir of Iris Murdoch, which has several references to an author, referred to as "the Dichter", who was a Nobel Laureate and whose works included Die Blendung [English title Auto-da-Fé]).

After Veza died in 1963, Canetti married Hera Buschor (1933–1988), with whom he had a daughter, Johanna, in 1972. Canetti's brother Jacques Canetti settled in Paris, where he championed a revival of French chanson. Despite being a German-language writer, Canetti settled in Britain until the 1970s, receiving British citizenship in 1952. For his last 20 years, Canetti lived mostly in Zürich.

Career
A writer in German, Canetti won the Nobel Prize in Literature in 1981, "for writings marked by a broad outlook, a wealth of ideas and artistic power". He is known chiefly for his celebrated trilogy of autobiographical memoirs of his childhood and of pre-Anschluss Vienna: Die Gerettete Zunge (The Tongue Set Free); Die Fackel im Ohr (The Torch in My Ear), and Das Augenspiel (The Play of the Eyes); for his modernist novel Auto-da-Fé (Die Blendung); and for Crowds and Power, a psychological study of crowd behaviour as it manifests itself in human activities ranging from mob violence to religious congregations.

In the 1970s, Canetti began to travel more frequently to Zurich, where he settled and lived for his last 20 years. He died in Zürich in 1994.

Honours and awards
 Prix International (France, 1949)
 Grand Austrian State Prize for Literature (1967)
 Literature Award of the Bavarian Academy of the Fine Arts (1969)
 Austrian Decoration for Science and Art (1972)
 Georg Büchner Prize (German Academy for Language and Literature, 1972)
 German recording prize, for reading "Ohrenzeuge" (Deutscher Schallplattenpreis) (1975)
 Nelly Sachs Prize (1975)
 Gottfried-Keller-Preis (1977)
 Pour le Mérite (1979)
 Johann-Peter-Hebel-Preis (Baden-Württemberg, 1980)
 Nobel Prize in Literature (1981)
 Franz Kafka Prize (1981)
 Grand Merit Cross of the Order of Merit of the Federal Republic of Germany (1983)
 In 1975, Canetti was awarded an honorary doctorate from the University of Manchester and another from the Ludwig Maximilian University of Munich, in 1976.
 Canetti Peak on Livingston Island in the South Shetland Islands, Antarctica, is named after him.

Works
 Komödie der Eitelkeit 1934 (The Comedy of Vanity)
 Die Blendung 1935 (Auto-da-Fé, novel, tr.  by Cicely Wedgwood (Jonathan Cape, Ltd., 1946). The first American edition of Wedgwood's translation was titled The Tower of Babel (Alfred A. Knopf, 1947).
 Die Befristeten 1956 (1956 premiere of the play in Oxford) (Their Days are Numbered)
 Masse und Macht 1960 (Crowds and Power, study, tr. 1962, published in Hamburg)
 Aufzeichnungen 1942 – 1948 (1965) (Sketches)
 Die Stimmen von Marrakesch 1968 published by Hanser in Munich (The Voices of Marrakesh, travelogue, tr. 1978)
 Der andere Prozess 1969 Kafkas Briefe an Felice (Kafka's Other Trial, tr. 1974).
 Hitler nach Speer (Essay)
 Die Provinz des Menschen Aufzeichnungen 1942 – 1972 (The Human Province, tr. 1978)
 Der Ohrenzeuge. Fünfzig Charaktere 1974 ("Ear Witness: Fifty Characters", tr. 1979).
 Das Gewissen der Worte 1975. Essays (The Conscience of Words)
 Die Gerettete Zunge 1977 (The Tongue Set Free, memoir, tr. 1979 by Joachim Neugroschel)
 Die Fackel im Ohr 1980 Lebensgeschichte 1921 – 1931 (The Torch in My Ear, memoir, tr. 1982)
 Das Augenspiel 1985 Lebensgeschichte 1931 – 1937 (The Play of the Eyes, memoir, tr. 1990)
 Das Geheimherz der Uhr: Aufzeichnungen 1987 (The Secret Heart of the Clock, tr. 1989)
 Die Fliegenpein (The Agony of Flies, 1992)
 Nachträge aus Hampstead (Notes from Hampstead, 1994)
 The Voices of Marrakesh (published posthumously, Arion Press, 2001, with photographs by Karl Bissinger and etchings by William T. Wiley )
 Party im Blitz; Die englischen Jahre 2003 (Party in the Blitz, memoir, published posthumously, tr. 2005)
 Aufzeichnungen für Marie-Louise (written 1942, compiled and published posthumously, 2005)

Reviews
 Stevenson, Randall (1982), The Privacy Industry of Franz Kafka, a review of Kafka's Other Trial: The Letters to Felice, in Cencrastus No. 9, Summer 1982, pp. 45 & 46, 

See also
 Crowd psychology
 List of Nobel laureates by country
List of refugees
 Marie-Louise von Motesiczky
 Ruth von Mayenburg

References

Bibliography
 Parry, I., "Attitudes to Power", in I. Parry, Speak Silence (1988), p. 253-
 Manuel Vázquez Montalbán and Willi Glasauer (1988). Scenes from World Literature and Portraits of Greatest Authors. Barcelona: Círculo de Lectores.
 Gentis, Roger, La folie Canetti, Paris: Maurice Nadeau, 1993
 Donahue, William Collins, The End of Modernism: Elias Canetti’s Auto-da-Fé (University of North Carolina Press, 2001).
 Brill, Lesley, "Terrorism, "Crowds and Power", and the Dogs of War", Anthropological Quarterly 76(1), Winter 2003: 87–94.
 Morgan, Peter (2005), "Georges Kien and the 'Diagnosis of Delusion' in Elias Canetti's Die Blendung", Twentieth-Century Literary Criticism Volume 157. United States: Gale.
 Donahue, William Collins and Julian Preece (eds), The Worlds of Elias Canetti: Centenary Essays (Cambridge Scholars Publishing, 2007).
 Lorenz, Dagmar C.G. (2009), "Introduction": A Companion to the Works of Elias Canetti.
 Brighenti, Andrea Mubi, "Elias Canetti and the Counter-Image of Resistance", Thesis Eleven, August 2011 vol. 106 no. 1 73-87.
 Antonello Lombardi, La scuola dell’ascolto: Oralità, suono e musica nell’opera di Elias Canetti, Ut Orpheus Edizioni, Bologna 2011, 
 Antonello Lombardi, "Gli animali mancanti: La fauna nell'opera di Elias Canetti", in In forma di parole, Animali, volume secondo, IV 2012, Bologna 2013.
 Antonello Lombardi, Le memorie di Georges Kien, Portatori d'Acqua, Pesaro 2015, 
 Antonello Lombardi, "Elias Canetti e la scuola dell'ascolto", in Nuova informazione bibliografica (il Mulino)]'' 2/2016, aprile-giugno

External links

 Encyclopædia Britannica profile
 Preface to Donahue, The End of Modernism
 
 
 
 Elias Canetti, Nobel Luminaries - Jewish Nobel Prize Winners, on the Beit Hatfutsot-The Museum of the Jewish People Website.
 
 

1905 births
1994 deaths
Nobel laureates in Literature
Austrian Nobel laureates
Austro-Hungarian Nobel laureates
British Nobel laureates
Bulgarian Nobel laureates
People from Ruse, Bulgaria
Austrian essayists
British Jewish writers
Bulgarian writers
German-language writers
Bulgarian Sephardi Jews
Jewish emigrants from Austria to the United Kingdom after the Anschluss
British essayists
Crowd psychologists
Bulgarian refugees
Bulgarian people of Italian descent
Bulgarian emigrants to England
Bulgarian emigrants to Switzerland
Georg Büchner Prize winners
Commanders Crosses of the Order of Merit of the Federal Republic of Germany
Franz Kafka scholars
Recipients of the Austrian Decoration for Science and Art
Recipients of the Pour le Mérite (civil class)
Swiss essayists
British emigrants to Switzerland
Naturalised citizens of the United Kingdom
20th-century essayists
Bulgarian people of Spanish descent
Jewish Austrian writers
Bulgarian emigrants to the Austro-Hungarian Empire